Myriostachya is a genus of Asian plants in the grass family. The only known species is Myriostachya wightiana, native to India, Bangladesh, Sri Lanka, Myanmar, Thailand, Sumatra, and Peninsular Malaysia.

References

Chloridoideae
Flora of Asia
Monotypic Poaceae genera